Blue blazer may refer to:

 Blue blazer, a Flaming drink
 A blue blazer, a type of jacket
 The Blue Blazer, the working name of professional wrestler Owen Hart

See also
 Blue Blaze (disambiguation)